Antonio Puglieschi (Florence, 1660 – Florence, 1732)  was an Italian painter of the late Baroque period, active mainly in Florence. he trained initially with Pietro Dandini in Florence, but then went to work in Rome with Ciro Ferri. The church of San Giovannino degli Scolopi in Florence, which formerly had been a Jesuit church,  has a canvas by Puglieschi of St Ignatius of Loyola before the Virgin. He also has a canvas in San Frediano in Cestello. One of his pupils was Giuseppe Bottani.

Sources
French Wikipedia Entry

1660 births
1732 deaths
18th-century Italian painters
Italian male painters
Painters from Florence
Italian Baroque painters
18th-century Italian male artists